Tales of Mystery was a British supernatural television drama anthology series based on the short stories of Algernon Blackwood. It was broadcast by ITV (Associated-Rediffusion) and ran over three seasons from 1961–1963. Produced by Peter Graham Scott, each episode was 25 minutes long and introduced by John Laurie (as the author himself). None of the 29 episodes broadcast survive in any television archive, however.

Episodes

Season 1
 The Terror of the Twins
 The Promise
 The Man Who Was Milligan
 The Tradition
 The Empty Sleeve
 Accessory Before The Fact
 The Woman's Ghost Story
 Decoy

Season 2
 Confession
 Chinese Magic
 Max Hensig
 The Man Who Found Out
 Nephele
 Ancient Sorceries
 Deferred Appointment
 The Pikerstaffe Cast
 The Telephone
 The Call
 Wolves of God

Season 3
 Old Clothes
 The Doll
 Egyptian Sorcery
 The Damned
 The Second Generation
 A Case of Eavesdropping
 Petershin And Mr Snide
 The Lodger
 The Insanity of Jones
 Dream Cottage

References

External links
IMDB Page
Tales of Mystery (EOFFTV)

1961 British television series debuts
1963 British television series endings
1960s British drama television series
1960s British anthology television series
British supernatural television shows
ITV television dramas
British fantasy television series
Television shows produced by Associated-Rediffusion
Black-and-white British television shows
English-language television shows